Ohyama Oku-Ike Dam  is an earthfill dam located in Hiroshima Prefecture in Japan. The dam is used for irrigation. The dam impounds about 0.4  ha of land when full and can store 38 thousand cubic meters of water. The construction of the dam was completed in 1943.

References

Dams in Hiroshima Prefecture